The Middle Gate was one of the city gates in the ancient walls of Piraeus, in Athens, Greece

History

Themistokles built the walls and city gates of Piraeus in 493 BC and according to Thucydides this marked the foundation of the city of Piraeus. However, most of the construction took place following the Greco-Persian Wars.

The city gates were monumental gates that formed the ancient entrance to Piraeus. They were built in the form of a dipylon and had a rectangular courtyard with two opposing entrances. Each Gate was reinforced with towers. The city walls were made out of ashlar, comprising large cut rectangular stones and the Gates were linked by two parallel roads that connected the main settlement of Athens with its harbour of Piraeus. One road lay between the Long Walls and the other lay outside them. The outside road ended at the City (Asty) Gate, which was built between 479 and 477 BC and is the older of the two City Gates.

Middle Gate

The Middle Gate was built after the City (Asty) Gate and after the construction of the Long Walls (southern and middle section). It was built in order to keep communication with Athens if the city was under siege. The Gate was built by Perikles in the fifth century BC. 

At this archaeological site the entire floor plan of the Middle Gate can be seen, together with traces of the door mechanism.

Gallery

References

Ancient Greek buildings and structures in Piraeus
City gates in Greece
Buildings and structures completed in the 5th century BC
Ancient Greek buildings and structures in Athens